Mateo Roskam (born 16 March 1987) is a Croatian retired footballer who last played for UKM in the Malaysia Premier League as a forward. His father Jean-Jacques was a guitarist in rock group Galija.

Career

Youth career
Hailing from Vrgorac, a town without a football club, Roskam went through the youth ranks of HNK Zmaj Makarska.

NK Zagreb
He later moved to Zagreb for his first senior season to join NK Zagreb.

Cultural y Deportiva Leonesa
Not getting a chance at Zagreb, he moved to Spain, joining the Segunda B side Cultural Leonesa, where he spent three seasons as a substitute.

NK Široki Brijeg
He moved to NK Široki Brijeg in 2010, establishing himself as a first team player.

NK Slaven Belupo
After three seasons at NK Široki Brijeg, in the summer of 2013, Rostam joined the Prva HNL side Slaven Belupo.

Sime Darby F.C.
In April 2014, he joined Sime Darby where he scored a hattrick against Kelantan in a 4–0 league win.

Tampines Rovers
After leaving Sime Darby, Roskam signed for S.League title contenders Tampines Rovers for the 2015 S.League Season. He scored his first competitive goal for Tampines in the second game of the season, earning his new side a 1–0 win against the Young Lions.

Sarawak
Mateo left Singapore and joined Sarawak for the 2017 Malaysia Super League season.

References

External links
 

1987 births
Living people
People from Vrgorac
Footballers from Split, Croatia
Croatian people of Belgian descent
Croatian people of Democratic Republic of the Congo descent
Association football forwards
Croatian footballers
NK Zagreb players
Cultural y Deportiva Leonesa players
NK Široki Brijeg players
NK Slaven Belupo players
Sime Darby F.C. players
Tampines Rovers FC players
Sarawak FA players
UKM F.C. players
Croatian Football League players
Segunda División B players
Premier League of Bosnia and Herzegovina players
Malaysia Super League players
Singapore Premier League players
Croatian expatriate footballers
Expatriate footballers in Spain
Croatian expatriate sportspeople in Spain
Expatriate footballers in Bosnia and Herzegovina
Croatian expatriate sportspeople in Bosnia and Herzegovina
Expatriate footballers in Malaysia
Croatian expatriate sportspeople in Malaysia
Expatriate footballers in Singapore
Croatian expatriate sportspeople in Singapore